The Ellensburg Rodeo Hall of Fame is a cowboy hall of fame. The hall of fame for the Ellensburg Rodeo was established in 1997. The hall of fame writes a biography for each inductee in a permanent file. It also collects and stores inductee rodeo mementos and artifacts, among many other important functions. Inductees are categorized as follows: (1) National Contestant; (2) Local Contestant; (3) Participant (clown, judge, announcer, trick rider, stock contractor etc.); (4) Volunteer Organizer; (5) Livestock; and (6) Pioneer Rodeo Family.

Hall of Fame Inductees

1997
 "Ought"
 Maude Barnett
 Bosque Boy
 Leonard Davis
Tom Ferguson
 Bill McMacken
Montie Montana
 Dean Oliver
 H.E. “Doc” Pfenning
Jim Shoulders
 Frank Wood
 Wranglerettes
 Larry Wyatt
 Yakama Indian Nation

1998
 Cooke Family
 Ellensburg Rodeo Posse
 Ferguson Family
 Gage Family
Charmayne James
 J. C. Kaynor
 Smokey Kayser
Pete Knight
 McEwen Family
 Morrison Family
 George Prescott
Scamper
 Thomas Family

1999
 Bernice Blair Dossey Bolen
 Christensen Brothers Rodeo Company
 Deb Copenhaver
 Driver Family
 Gene Miles

2000
 Harry Anderson
 Necklace
 Wick Peth
 Schnebly Family
 Kenny Stanton
 Harry Vold

2001
 Buff Brady, Jr.
 Bill Linderman
 John P. Foster
Larry Mahan
Casey Tibbs
 Kittitas County Roping Club
Warpaint

2002
 Badger Mountain
 Bernard and Moomaw
 Harry Charters
 Fitterer Family
 Harry Knight
 Mickey

2003
 Anderson Family
 Schaller Bennett
 Frank Bryant
 Clint Corey
 Phil Gardenhire
 Lou Richards
 Lee Scott

2004
 Joe Beaver
 Everett Bowman
 Joe Kelsey Rodeo Company
 Loyd Ketchum
 Kenny McLean
 Red One
 Bob Swaim
 Widow Maker

2005
 Joe Alexander
 Jimmie Cooper
 King County Posse
 McManamy Family
 Rose and Red Wall
Tornado

2006
 Beard Rodeo Company
 Spirit of the Trail Night Pageant
 Homegrown
 John Ludkta
 Rod Lyman
Marty Wood

2007
 Allen Bach
 Katherine Bach with Foxy Coke
 DeVere Helfrich
 John and Gwen Jordan (Honorees)
 Minor Family

2008
 Stuart Anderson
Guy Allen
 Dick Griffith

2009
 Big Bend/Flying 5 Rodeo Company
 Butch Lehmkuhler
 Charlie Sampson
 Spring Fling

2010
 Dan and Judy Ackley
 Eddie Akridge
 Nason Aronica Family

2011
 Ellensburg Rodeo Royalty
 Allen Faltus
 Fred Palmiero

2012
Trevor Brazile
 Dr. Ken MacRae

2013
 Calgary Stampede Ranch
 Grated Coconut
 Gary Remple
 Buz Peth

2014
 Bill McKay
 Bud Munroe
 Scott Repp

2015
 Vern Castro
 Nell Henderson
 John W. Jones Jr.
 Jan Smith

2016
 Miles Hare
 Rodeo Grandmas

2017
 John Payne – 'The One Arm Bandit'
 The Smith Family

2018
 Jake Barnes
 Katherine 'Kay' Hageman
 Clay O’Brien Cooper
 Frank Wallace Family

2019
 The Burkheimer Family
Flint Rasmussen

2020
 Slim Pickens
 Mabel Stickland

Source:

References

External links 
 Official Website

Cowboy halls of fame
Sports halls of fame
Sports hall of fame inductees
Awards established in 1997
Museums established in 1997
Lists of sports awards